Tabagie may refer to:

Tabagie (feast), a traditional festivity among the Algonquin peoples of Eastern Canada
Tabagie (room), a room designated for smoking tobacco